Beatty Airport  is a county-owned public-use airport located three nautical miles (6 km) southwest of the central business district of Beatty, a town in Nye County, Nevada, United States.

Facilities and aircraft 
It has one runway designated 16/34 with an asphalt surface measuring 5,600 by 60 feet (1,707 x 18 m).

For the 12-month period ending December 31, 2009, the airport had 1,005 aircraft operations, an average of 83 per month: 90% general aviation, 7% air taxi, and 3% military. At that time there were 9 aircraft based at this airport: 56% single-engine, 11% multi-engine and 33% glider.

References

External links 
  from Nevada DOT
 Aerial image as of June 1993 from USGS The National Map
 

Airports in Nevada
Buildings and structures in Nye County, Nevada
Transportation in Nye County, Nevada